Manuel (1896–1900) was an American Thoroughbred racehorse.

Background
He was foaled in Kentucky and was a bay colt sired by Bob Miles out of the mare Espanita (by Alarm). He is related through his grandsire to 1907 Derby winner Pink Star. Manuel was bred by George James Long at his Louisville stud farm, Bashford Manor Stable.

Racing career
Long retained ownership of Manuel throughout his two-year-old season, finally selling him in October 1898 to the Morris brothers for $15,000.[3] He won the 1899 Kentucky Derby in what was deemed a very uneventful race. A few days after the Derby at Churchill Downs, Manuel injured his leg by stepping in a hole in the track which prompted his withdraw from racing for the rest of the season.

Retirement
Manuel was sold to Frank Morel (through his agent J. Baker) as a four-year-old in October 1900 for $500 at the Morris Park sale. Manuel only raced for two seasons and did not produce any registered offspring. A 1910 Daily Racing Form article states that he died shortly thereafter as a four-year-old.

Pedigree

References

1896 racehorse births
1900 racehorse deaths
Racehorses trained in the United States
Racehorses bred in Kentucky
Kentucky Derby winners
Thoroughbred family 4-r
Byerley Turk sire line